Dinesh Dhanai (born 4 November 1970) is an Indian politician. He has run as an independent MLA in Tehri (2012-2017) and served as a minister in the last Congress government in Uttarakhand.

Early life and education
Dinesh Dhanai was born in 1970 in the village of Khand Gaon (Patti Athoor) near Old Tehri, Tehri Garhwal district, into a Rajput family, to Gabbar Singh Dhanai and Phool Devi. He is an alumnus of SRTC Campus Old Tehri (Tehri Garhwal). He started his political career as a party worker in 1986.

Political career
Dhanai joined the Indian National Congress in 1986 at Garhwal University (SRTC). He also served as a president of his university in 1992 - SRTC Garhwal University (Old Tehri). Over the years, he has held several positions such as Joint Secretary, UP Youth Congress (2nd term) in 1994; Chairman- Urban Co-Operative Bank Ltd., Tehri Garhwal in 1995; Vice President, UP Youth Congress, 1999.

In 2003, he stood as an Independent candidate from Tehri Nagar Palika, defeating both Congress and BJP candidates. He served there until 2008. During his chairmanship, he contested legislative assembly elections in 2007 as an independent candidate and came in third place.

Dhanai again ran as an independent for the same seat in 2012. His attempt to enter the legislative assembly was successful, with a close margin from the INC and BJP.

He served as chairman of Garhwal Mandal Vikas Nigam as MoS for two years.

In 2014, he was inducted into Harish Rawat's cabinet.

Uttarakhand Jan Ekta Party
In 2019, Dhanai announced the formation of a new political party, the Uttarakhand Jan Ekta Party, with the intent of representing issues relating to the state of Uttarakhand on the national level.

References

External links
 Dinesh Dhanai (Independent(IND): Constituency - Tehri (Tehri Garhwal) - Affidavit Information of Candidate:
 Dinesh Dhanai, an independent MLA from Tehri - Moneycontrol.com
 Uttarakhand CM drops Amrita, inducts Dinesh - Hindustan Times
 Uttarakhand Governor Aziz Qureshi today administered the oath of office as Cabinet minister to MLA (Tehri Vidhan Sabha constituency) Dinesh Dhanai.

1970 births
Living people
Members of the Uttarakhand Legislative Assembly
Uttarakhand politicians
Indian National Congress politicians
State cabinet ministers of Uttarakhand